Banded Brothers (also known as Banded Brothers: The Mongoose Mob) is a British television program airing on BBC Two on Sundays during February and March 2010. Filmed and presented in the style of Meerkat Manor, it follows the regular lives and activities of a family of banded mongooses being monitored by the Banded Mongoose Research Project of the University of Exeter, in Uganda's Queen Elizabeth National Park.

External links
 
 
 The Banded Mongoose Project

2010 British television series debuts
2010 British television series endings
2010s British documentary television series
BBC television documentaries
BBC high definition shows
Nature educational television series
English-language television shows